Air Memphis was a charter airline based in Cairo, Egypt. Its main base was Cairo International Airport.

History
The airline was established in August 1995 and started operations in March 1996. It had branches in Sharm ِAl Sheikh, Hurghada, Luxor, Aswan, and Abu Simbel. It had 530 employees as of March 2010., airline bought by Ramy lakah in 2013 and new CEO Khalid Hassanain, company did some flights to Iran, later new owner  changed the name to Air Leisure,

Fleet
As of December 2016 Air Memphis does not operate any aircraft.

References

External links

Air Memphis at ATDB: profile, history and events, contacts and management, historical/current/planned aircraft in fleets

Defunct airlines of Egypt
Airlines established in 1995
Airlines disestablished in 2013
2013 disestablishments in Egypt
Egyptian companies established in 1995